The 2016–17 Kentucky Wildcats women's basketball team represents University of Kentucky during the 2016–17 NCAA Division I women's basketball season. The Wildcats, led by tenth year head coach Matthew Mitchell, play their home games at the Memorial Coliseum with one game at Rupp Arena and were members of the Southeastern Conference. They finished the season 22–11, 11–5 in SEC play to finish in a tie for third place. They advanced to the semifinals of the SEC women's tournament where they lost to South Carolina. They received an at-large to the NCAA women's tournament where they defeated Belmont in the first round before losing to Ohio State in the second round.

Roster

Schedule

|-
!colspan=9 style="background:#273BE2; color:white;"| Exhibition

|-
!colspan=9 style="background:#273BE2; color:white;"| Non-conference regular season

|-
!colspan=9 style="background:#273BE2; color:white;"| SEC regular season

|-
!colspan=9 style="background:#273BE2; color:white;"| SEC Women's Tournament

|-
!colspan=9 style="background:#273BE2; color:white;"| NCAA Women's Tournament

Rankings

See also
 2016–17 Kentucky Wildcats men's basketball team

References

Kentucky
Kentucky Wildcats women's basketball seasons
Kentucky
Kentucky
Kentucky